Meyerowitz (Polish: Majerowicz) is a Yiddish-language surname. It is a patronymic surname literally meaning "descendant of Meyer" (Polish phonetic transcription: Majer), derived with the Polish-language patronymic suffix -wicz. 

It can be transcribed via Russian language as Meyerovich. 
The surname may refer to:

 Elliot Meyerowitz (born 1951), U.S. biologist
 Herbert Vladimir Meyerowitz (1900-1945), British artist
 Jan Meyerowitz (1913-1998), German-American composer
 Joel Meyerowitz (born 1938), U.S. photographer
 Rick Meyerowitz (born 1943), U.S. artist

See also 
 22537 Meyerowitz, asteroid
Meyrowitz

Yiddish-language surnames